Magic Temple is a 1996 Filipino family-fantasy-adventure film directed by the acclaimed director Peque Gallaga and his directing partner Lore Reyes. Released by Star Cinema. It was written by Peque Gallaga, Lore Reyes and Erik Matti. It is notable for winning all of the 14 nominations including the Best Film at the 1996 Metro Manila Film Festival.

Plot
The magical world of "Samadhi", threatened by the evil forces of Ravenal. Sifu sends out three teenage boys to journey on the Magic Temple. Jubal, Sambag and Omar, each with their own unique power, battles the threat to the world of "Samadhi" and along the way faces many extraordinary things.
The boys are sure to face a huge battle ahead of them but with the help of magical creatures they met along their journey, evil is eliminated and they learn the true value of camaraderie and believing in themselves to face any problem.

Cast
Jason Salcedo as Jubal
Junell Hernando as Sambag
Marc Solis as Omar
Erwin Meregildo as Wewin
Anna Larrucea as Yasmin
Jun Urbano as Sifu
Jackie Lou Blanco as Ravenal
Gina Pareño as Telang Bayawak
Aljon Jimenez as Rexor
Cholo Escaño as Sisig
Koko Trinidad as Grand Master
Sydney Sacdalan as Shaolin Child
Chubi del Rosario as Gamay
Mae-Ann Adonis as Rexor's mother
Alvin Froy Alemania as Young Sambag
Tess Dumpit as Jubal's mother
Kristopher Peralta as young Rexor
Carlo Aquino as young Jubal

Trivia
The names of the three main characters has national symbolism in it. Jubal is an Igorot, a tribe from Luzon; Sambag is a Visayan word for Tamarind from the Visayas and Omar is a name found among the Muslim tribes of Mindanao. The names, therefore, accounts for the Philippines major islands.

Recognitions

Awards and nominations

Special awards

Remake
A remake of the film was announced in December 2018 to be produced by ABS-CBN and Cre8 Productions. Mikhail Red will direct the project.

References

External links

Star Cinema films
1996 films
Tagalog-language films
Philippine fantasy adventure films
1990s fantasy adventure films
Films directed by Peque Gallaga
Films directed by Lore Reyes